Sebastián Eduardo Crismanich (born 30 October 1986 in Corrientes) is an Argentine taekwondo athlete. He won the gold medal in the men's 80 kg division at the 2012 Summer Olympics.

Sebastián has the distinction of being the second individual athlete to win a gold medal for Argentina, the inaugural taekwondo medal for Argentina. The gold medal honor was established at the 1948 Summer Olympics, when Delfo Cabrera entered the stadium concluding the marathon.

In his quest for the gold medal, Crismanich beat New Zealander Vaughn Scott 9-5, and then Afghan Nesar Ahmad Bahawi 9-1 in the quarterfinals.

After a fierce battle in the semifinals, Crismanich defeated Armenian Arman Yeremyan 2-1 and proceeded to the Olympic final.

In a narrow victory against Spaniard Nicolas Garcia Hemme, Crismanich was only able to take the advantage needed to win in the final round, seconds from the end.

He was honored as the national flag bearer at the London 2012 Summer Olympics Closing Ceremony Parade of Flags.

Biography
Sebastián Crismanich was born in Corrientes, Corrientes Province, into a Croatian immigrant family. His brother, Mauro, is also a well-known taekwondo practitioner who won the bronze medal in men's flyweight (under 58 kg) at the 2009 World Taekwondo Championships in Copenhagen.

References

1986 births
Living people
Argentine male taekwondo practitioners
Olympic taekwondo practitioners of Argentina
Taekwondo practitioners at the 2012 Summer Olympics
People from Corrientes
Pan American Games gold medalists for Argentina
Olympic gold medalists for Argentina
Olympic medalists in taekwondo
Argentine people of Croatian descent
Medalists at the 2012 Summer Olympics
Pan American Games medalists in taekwondo
South American Games silver medalists for Argentina
South American Games gold medalists for Argentina
South American Games medalists in taekwondo
Taekwondo practitioners at the 2011 Pan American Games
Competitors at the 2010 South American Games
Competitors at the 2014 South American Games
National University of Córdoba alumni
Medalists at the 2011 Pan American Games
Sportspeople from Corrientes Province
21st-century Argentine people